Bill C-20 refers to various legislation introduced into the House of Commons of Canada, including: 
 Clarity Act, relating to the secession of a province, introduced in 1999 to the second session of the 36th Parliament
 An Act to amend the Criminal Code (protection of children and other vulnerable persons) and the Canada Evidence Act, introduced in 2002 to the second session of the 37th Canadian Parliament; not passed but subsequently re-introduced
 Fair Representation Act, concerning redistribution, introduced in 2011 to the first session of the 41st Parliament

Canadian federal legislation